The Matrix: Path of Neo is a 2005 action-adventure video game developed by Shiny Entertainment and published by Atari. The game was written and co-directed by the Wachowskis, who wrote and directed the first three The Matrix films and the 2003 video game Enter the Matrix, also developed by Shiny Entertainment. Players control the character Neo, participating in scenes from the films.

The game received mixed reviews from critics.

Overview
The Matrix: Path of Neo allows the player to participate in many of the major action scenes in the films. Most of these sequences, picked by the movie directors themselves, are taken from the first film in the series.

At the start of the game, the player is hacker Thomas Anderson, and does not possess any of the powers that the character will later discover as Neo. He has to find his way through by stealth and basic brawl. As the game continues, players learn new skills and techniques, equipping Neo for the final showdown with Agent Smith. These additional skills may be levels and in the main game. Many of these skills are used by Neo in the trilogy, including the bullet dodge, bullet stop, and flight. A number of weapons are available in the game, consisting of both melee weapons (including various types of swords, staves, and escrimas) and firearms (assault rifle, sub-machine gun, pistol etc.).

The game also allows the player to meet many of the characters in the films, including Trinity, Morpheus and the Merovingian, among others.

The game uses film excerpts as cut scenes throughout the game at certain milestones. This footage includes clips from the original The Matrix theatrical films, and from other sources, including the short film series, The Animatrix and Enter the Matrix.

The PC & Xbox versions also lack certain visual effects compared to the PS2 version such as the image warping.

Reception

The Matrix: Path of Neo received "mixed or average reviews" on all platforms according to video game review aggregator Metacritic. In Japan, Famitsu gave the PlayStation 2 version a score of one seven, two sixes, and one seven, for a total of 26 out of 40.

CiN Weekly gave it a score of 81 out of 100 and called it "An interesting re-imagining of the Matrix story in the form of an action game with OK controls and annoying camera." The New York Times gave it a positive review and stated: "After spawning two mediocre sequels, a collection of dull cartoon shorts and a couple of forgettable video games, there is some life left in the Matrix franchise after all, as this game proves." USA Today, however, gave it six stars out of ten and stated that the game "underwhelms, failing to convey the spark and visual appeal of the films."

References

External links

 

2005 video games
Atari games
PlayStation 2 games
Path of Neo
Third-person shooters
Video games developed in the United States
Video games about virtual reality
Post-apocalyptic video games
Stealth video games
Windows games
Video games directed by The Wachowskis
Xbox games
Video games designed by David Perry
Shiny Entertainment games
Video games with time manipulation
Action-adventure games
Single-player video games
Video games using Havok